Michal Grman (born July 30, 1982) is a Slovak former professional ice hockey defenceman.

Grman played 39 games in the Czech Extraliga for HC Karlovy Vary until he was released by the team on November 22, 2013. He also played in the Tipsport Liga for MHk 32 Liptovský Mikuláš, HK Nitra, MsHK Žilina, HC Kosice and HC '05 Banská Bystrica.

Career statistics

References

External links

1982 births
Living people
HC Baník Sokolov players
HC '05 Banská Bystrica players
LHK Jestřábi Prostějov players
HC Karlovy Vary players
HC Košice players
MKS Cracovia (ice hockey) players
MHk 32 Liptovský Mikuláš players
HK Nitra players
Slovak ice hockey defencemen
Sportspeople from Liptovský Mikuláš
Yertis Pavlodar players
MsHK Žilina players
Slovak expatriate ice hockey players in the Czech Republic
Slovak expatriate sportspeople in Kazakhstan
Slovak expatriate sportspeople in Poland
Expatriate ice hockey players in Kazakhstan
Expatriate ice hockey players in Poland